Al-Bernameg (Egyptian Arabic  pronunciation: [elberˈnæːmeɡ], literally "The Show") was an Egyptian news satire program. The show was hosted by Bassem Youssef on the free-to-air channel MBC MASR and reruns are aired on Deutsche Welle; it was formerly broadcast on the satellite channels CBC and OnTV Egypt. Bassem Youssef announced on 2 June 2014 that the show was cancelled.

Its satirical style, willing to poke fun at powerful personages across the political spectrum, on hiatus from his own hosting duties, returned the favour on 25 October 2013. On 1 November 2013, the show was pulled from CBC over differences with the broadcaster. The suspension of the show raised questions about media freedom in Egypt following the 2013 Egyptian coup d'état. In early 2014, MBC MASR picked up the show, airing its first episode on 7 February 2014.

The B+ Show
Following the 18-day-protests of the Jan 25th revolution, The B+ Show was created by Tarek El Kazzaz and Bassem Youssef, as a political satire show commenting on the events and how the mainstream media presented them. Together they teamed up with Amr Ismail as Producer and Mohamed Khalifa as Director of a 5-minute episode for online viewing.

The B+ Show was named after Youssef's blood type; B+, and was shot entirely in Youssef's laundry room with one table, one chair, one camera and a banner with amateur images of Tahrir Square.

For every five-minute episode, Youssef and his team used to watch up to ten hours of videos for research to help them write the script.

Uploaded for the first time in May 2011, The B+ Show gained more than five million views in the first three months alone, on its YouTube Channel.

Nine webisodes later, Egyptian channel ONTV offered Youssef to create a political satire TV show Al-Bernameg, literally translating to "the show".

Al-Bernameg Season 1
The show's move to Egyptian channel ONTV made it one of the first internet to TV conversion in the Middle East.

The show premiered in Ramadan 2011, and became the platform for many writers, artists, and politicians to speak freely about the social and political scene.

Season one of Al-Bernameg aired a total of 104; 30-min episodes and was produced by Qsoft Ltd.

Al-Bernameg Season 2
Despite the great success of Al-Bernameg on ONTV, the team always aspired to be the first live-audience TV show of its genre in the Middle East. Having that vision in mind, Ahmed Abbas, the Chief Operations Officer of Qsoft and Al-Bernameg’s Project Director, started working on taking this idea further to create a multifaceted brand for Al-Bernameg. In the summer of 2012, the team successfully reached a deal with Capital Broadcast Network (CBC) to air the new season of the show with the new format, moving it from ONTV's studios to the majestic building of Radio Cinema and Theatre, which is an exact replica of Radio City Music Hall in New York, accommodating 220 guests in total for every episode. Al-Bernameg, which aired its premiere in November 2012, was the first to have a live audience in the Middle East and recorded one of the highest viewership ratings on both TV and Internet; with a combined viewership of around 120 million on YouTube alone.

Radio Theatre, which is owned by Al-Ismailia for Real Estate Investment, underwent a massive renovation process to transform it into a live audience studio for the show while maintaining the aesthetics of the architecture and the interiors of the historical building. Under the leadership of the same Executive Producer, Amr Ismail, the team hired the production designer, Christopher George, and the lighting director, Mark Kenyon, of The X-Factor UK to design the new set of Al-Bernameg.

The second season of Al-Bernameg consisted of 29 episodes. The show gained tremendous success through its humorous yet bold criticism of former Egyptian President Mohamed Morsi, representing the Muslim Brotherhood.

The show's format evolved to include three segments, starting with Youssef's usual witty and humorous observations on current events, sketches performed by the team, and ending with guests from the entire political spectrum, music bands and artistic talents.

As Al-Bernameg continued with its growing success, Jon Stewart appeared as a guest on the show in June 2013, marking one of the all-time highlights of Al-Bernameg episodes. Other celebrity guests such as Amr Waked, in addition to a large number of Egypt's and the region's most popular music bands and performers, appeared on the show. Al-Bernameg also enjoyed diversity in its audience every week, including public figures such as Hamdeen Sabahi, Yosri Fouda, Elissa, Assala Nasri, Ziad Rahbani and Angham.

Soon after the show started airing, complaints were filed against it and its host, with accusations of insulting Islam, President Morsi and disrupting public order and peace. However, Al-Bernameg’s team sustained its critical tone, risking the future of the show and holding on to the right of freedom of expression.

Season two of Al-Bernameg aired a total of 29 60-min episodes.

Al-Bernameg Season 3
In October 2013, CBC suspended the airing of Al-Bernameg season 2, claiming that “the show has not been abiding by the editorial policy of the network.” In February 2014, Al-Bernameg returned with its third season, on MBC Masr satellite channel with a second re-run on Deutsche Welle (DW). The show achieved unprecedented viewership ratings every week.

Season three of Al-Bernameg aired 11 60-min episodes.

In March 2014, Nilesat announced that it was investigating jamming of broadcasts of Al-Bernameg, credit for which had been claimed by an organisation known as the Egyptian Cyber Army.

In April 2014, MBC announced that they would suspend broadcasting of the show until the end of May “to avoid influencing Egyptian voters’ opinion and public opinion” in the run-up to the 2014 Egyptian presidential election.

In June 2014, Youssef announced the termination of Al-Bernameg where he said that the pressure on him, his family, and MBC had become too great.

See also
 List of Egyptian television series

References

External links
Official YouTube
Bassem Youssef 2013 IPFA Acceptance Speech

Arabic-language television shows
Television shows set in Egypt
Egyptian Crisis (2011–2014)
News parodies
Egyptian comedy television series
ONTV (Egyptian TV channel) original programming
Capital Broadcasting Center original programming